Wyke may refer to:

Places in England
Wyke, North Dorset, an area of Gillingham
Wyke Regis, Dorset
 Wyke, Shropshire
Wyke Champflower, Somerset  
 Wyke, Surrey 
 Wyke, Bradford, an area of Bradford, West Yorkshire
Wyke, an area of Kingston upon Hull, East Riding of Yorkshire
 Wyke College, a school
Wike, West Yorkshire, a hamlet in Leeds district, West Yorkshire

People
Charlie Wyke (born 1992), English footballer
 Charles Lennox Wyke (1815-1897), British diplomat
Maria Wyke (born 1957), English professor of Latin
Roger Wyke (died c.1467), English member of Parliament

Broadcast call signs
 WYKE-CD, a low-power television station (channel 24, virtual 47) licensed to serve Inglis/Yankeetown, Florida, United States
 WXZC, a radio station (104.3 FM) licensed to serve Inglis, Florida, which held the call sign WYKE from 2011 to 2018

See also
Lower Wyke, Hampshire, England
Middle Wyke, Hampshire, England
North Wyke, Devon, England
Wyke Farms
Wyke House, Middlesex, England
 Wykes, a surname